Inukshuk Wireless Inc. is a joint venture of BCE Inc. and Rogers Communications, created in 2005 to establish a Canada-wide network for wireless Internet connectivity in 45 major cities and more than 120 rural communities, throughout the ten Industry Canada licensed areas.  Bell and Rogers separately market the service to their customers as Portable Internet, although Bell also offers a Rural Internet service.

History
Inukshuk Internet, a predecessor to Inukshuk Wireless, was originally formed in 1999.  Inukshuk was acquired by Microcell in 2001, which was acquired by Rogers in 2004.  The spectrum and technology was merged into the joint venture with Bell in 2005.

Until November 7, 2008, Bell Internet Portable was referred to as Sympatico High Speed Unplugged or Bell WiMAX Unplugged. Likewise, Bell Internet Rural was referred to as Bell WiMAX In-home.

Bell had announced termination of its Portable Internet service on February 14, 2012.
Rogers had announced termination of its Portable Internet service on March 1, 2012.

The 30Mhz slice of 2300Mhz spectrum was transferred to Orion Wireless Partnership, for a fixed wireless LTE national network.

Network
The Inukshuk network was built using pre-WiMAX technology provided by Expedience solution from Motorola, now Nexpedience Networks.

Coverage
The network provides connectivity to 45 major cities and more than 120 rural communities throughout the ten Industry Canada licensed areas.

Activation, however, is only available in certain rural regions.  Bell only allowed customers in the following regions of the province of Ontario to subscribe to Portable or Rural Internet:

 Bruce County
 Dawn-Euphemia
 Dufferin County
 Laurentian Valley
 Middlesex County
 Simcoe County
 South Glengarry

Services

Wireless Internet
Monthly bandwidth limits for customers were not tightly enforced, and simply existed to protect against network abuse.  Bell's Rural ("In-home") service used the same technology as the portable ("Unplugged") product, except the modem itself was mounted to a user's home in the direction of the tower it would have connected to.  Hence, it was not designed to be portable.

Bell also offered "Unplugged" service for businesses.

Peer-to-peer throttling
Inukshuk Wireless throttled peer-to-peer (P2P) traffic on its network during peak times of the day.

For Bell customers, downloads and uploads were throttled to 512 kbit/s from 16h30 to 17h59 EST, then to 256 kbit/s from 18h00 to 23h59 EST, and again to 512 kbit/s from 0h00 to 1h00 EST every day.  No throttling occurred from 1h00 to 16h30.

References

External links

Bell Canada
Internet service providers of Canada
Rogers Communications
Telecommunications companies established in 1999
1999 establishments in Canada